Huancabamba District is one of eight districts of the province Huancabamba in Peru.

References

pt:Huancabamba (distrito de Oxapampa)